Sonia Sahni is an Indian actress who worked in Hindi language films. Her debut film was Johar-Mehmood in Goa with actors I. S. Johar and Mehmood. Her other notable films are Maalik (1972 film), Buddha Mil Gaya, Bobby, Dharam Karam, Chacha Bhatija and Jangal Mein Mangal.

Career
Producer-director Roop Shourie and I. S. Johar cast Sonia in Johar-Mehmood in Goa, which was successful. Sahni signed a five year contract with I. S. Johar. She worked with Kishore Kumar, Mehmood, Sanjeev Kumar, Dev Kumar, Sujit Kumar etc. during that period. She could also act opposite heroes like Dharmendra, Raj Kapoor, Raaj Kumar, Dev Anand etc. In the 1973 film Bobby, she acted as Mrs. Sushma Nath, mother of Rishi Kapoor. Later she acted as second lead in many films of popular heroines such as Hema Malini, Waheeda Rehman, Parveen Babi, Zeenat Aman and Rekha.

 Filmography Johar-Mehmood in Goa (1965) as RitaMaya (1966) as Sheela Johar in Kashmir (1966) as Salma Mohammed Hussein Akalmand (1966)Johar in Bombay (1967) as NaliniMera Naam Johar (1968)Raat Ke Andhere Mein (1969) Bandish (1969)Dupatta (1970) as Punjabi language filmSasta Khoon Mehnga Pyar (1970)Kaun Ho Tum (1970)Heer Raanjha (1970) as (Guest Appearance)Sharafat (1970) as Rekha Darpan (1970) as BijliUpaasna (1971)Johar Mehmood in Hong Kong (1971) as Ms. Sonia / Usha Roy Hulchul (1971) as SeemaBuddha Mil Gaya (1971) as MonaAndaz (1971) as LilyBhaavna (1972)Jangal Mein Mangal (1972) as Professor LaxmiMaalik (1972 film) (1972) as NarangiJugnu (1973) as SoniaBobby (1973) as Mrs. Sushma Nath Wahi Raat Wahi Aawaz (1973)Dharma (1973)Kasauti (1974) as Nita36 Ghante (1974) as KaminiDharam Karam (1975) as Sonu A. Kumar Neelima (1975)Maha Chor (1976) as Parmeshwari Khalifa (1976) as SweetyChange Mande Tere Bande (1976)Shankar Dada (1976) as QueenBullet (1976) as MalaAap Ki Khatir (1977)Niyaz Aur Namaaz (1977)Chalta Purza (1977) as NurseChacha Bhatija (1977) as Sonia Kaala Aadmi (1978)Dera Aashqan Da (1979)Aulea-E-Islam (1979)Ladke Baap Se Badke (1979) as Mrs. SharmaShradhanjali (1981) as RaniBe-Shaque (1981) as NirmalaMaan Gaye Ustaad (1981) as Malti C. Singh Chorni (1982) as Mrs. Sheela SagarJawalaa Dahej Ki (1982)Bandhan Kuchchey Dhaagon Ka (1983) as Sneh's Nurse Lal Chunariyaa (1983)Do Gulab (1983)Meri Adalat (1984)Ganga Ki Beti (1985)Sitamgar (1985) as Mrs. Nath Zulm Ka Badla (1985)Superman (1987 film) (1987) as EditorLakhpati (1991) as Mrs. Nath Raunaq (1993) as Mrs. BakshiAflatoon (1997) as professorAnari No. 1 (1999) as Mrs. MalhotraPhool Aur Aag (1999)Love in Bombay (2013)

 Television 
 2001-2002  Jannat 2002-2003 Kkusum as Nanima
 2015-2017  Santoshi Maa'' as Dadi

References

Living people
Year of birth missing (living people)
Indian film actresses